is located in Kita-ku Niigata, Niigata. It is used for horse racing. It was built in 1965. The capacity of the stadium is 75,000.

Physical attributes
Niigata Race Course has a turf course with two distinct ovals, and a dirt course. Jump races are conducted using fences on the turf course.

The turf's  measures 2248m ( miles + 144 feet),  the  measures 1648m (1 + 42 feet) and the  measures 1000m (1/2 miles + 639 feet). 

The dirt course measures 1,472 meters (7/8 miles + 207 feet).

Notable races

External links 
 Venue information

Horse racing venues in Japan
Sports venues in Niigata Prefecture
Buildings and structures in Niigata (city)